The 2021 UNLV Rebels football team represented the University of Nevada, Las Vegas in the 2021 NCAA Division I FBS football season. The Rebels were led by second–year head coach Marcus Arroyo and played their home games at Allegiant Stadium. They were members of the West Division of the Mountain West Conference.

Previous season
The Rebels finished the 2020 season 0–6, their worst record since 1998 and were not invited for a bowl game.

Preseason

Mountain West media days
The Mountain West media days were held on July 21–22, 2021, at the Cosmopolitan in Paradise, Nevada.

Media poll
The preseason poll was released on July 21, 2021. The Rebels were predicted to finish in sixth place in the MW West Division.

Schedule

Game summaries

No. 11 (FCS) Eastern Washington

at No. 23 Arizona State

No. 14 Iowa State

at No. 22 Fresno State

at UTSA

Utah State

San Jose State

at Nevada

at New Mexico

Hawaii

No. 19 San Diego State

at Air Force

References

UNLV
UNLV Rebels football seasons
UNLV Rebels football